Nymphicula plumbilinealis is a moth in the family Crambidae. It was described by David John Lawrence Agassiz in 2014. It is found in Papua New Guinea.

The wingspan is 12–13 mm. The base of the forewings is pale fuscous with a yellowish antemedian fascia. The median area is scattered with fuscous scales. The base of the hindwings is fuscous with a white subbasal fascia and antemedian fascia.

Etymology
The species name refers to the leaden line on the hindwings.

References

Nymphicula
Moths described in 2014